Dame Mary Monica Cunliffe-Owen, Mrs Wills  DStJ (18 January 1861 – 2 April 1931) was an English philanthropist.

Early years
She was born in Brompton, Middlesex, the daughter of Sir Philip Cunliffe-Owen and Jenny Eliza Pamila Julia (von Reitzenstein). In 1886, she married Henry Herbert Wills, a member of the Wills tobacco family; the union was apparently childless. She spent her latter years at Rockdunder, Wrington, Somerset, and it was there that she died on 2 April 1931. Her sister, Victoria Mary Louise Adelaide Cunliffe-Owen, was married to the publisher Otto Kyllmann.

External links
Biodata and will information

References

1931 deaths
1861 births
British philanthropists
Dames Commander of the Order of the British Empire
Dames of Grace of the Order of St John
People from Kensington
People from Wrington